Open Country is a 1922 British silent drama film directed by Sinclair Hill and starring Dorinea Shirley, David Hawthorne and Bertram Burleigh. The film's sets were designed by the head of Stoll Pictures's art department Walter Murton.

Synopsis
A wealthy man decides to become a wandering artist.

Cast
 Dorinea Shirley as Sanchia Percival  
 David Hawthorne as Neville Ingram  
 Bertram Burleigh as Jack Senhouse  
 George Bellamy as Mr. Percival  
 Norma Whalley as Mrs. Percival  
 Miles Mander as Honorable William Chevenix  
 Bryan Powley as Roger Charnock
 Rosina Wright

References

Bibliography
 Low, Rachael. History of the British Film, 1918-1929. George Allen & Unwin, 1971.

External links

1922 films
1922 drama films
British silent feature films
British drama films
1920s English-language films
Films directed by Sinclair Hill
Stoll Pictures films
Films shot at Cricklewood Studios
British black-and-white films
1920s British films
Silent drama films